Pad thai, phat thai, or phad thai ( or ; , , ISO: p̄hạd thịy, 'Thai stir fry'), is a stir-fried rice noodle dish commonly served as a street food in Thailand as part of the country's cuisine. It is typically made with rice noodles, shrimp, peanuts, a scrambled egg, and bean sprouts. The ingredients are fried in a wok.

Ingredients
Pad thai is made with rice noodles, which are stir fried with eggs and chopped firm tofu, flavored with tamarind juice, fish sauce, dried shrimp, garlic, shallots, may add red chili pepper and palm sugar, and served with lime wedges and often crushed roasted peanuts. It may contain other vegetables like bean sprouts, garlic chives, and raw banana flowers. It may also contain fresh shrimp, crab, squid, chicken or other fish or meat.

Many of the ingredients are provided on the side as condiments, such as the red chili pepper, lime wedges, roasted peanuts, bean sprouts, spring onion and other miscellaneous fresh vegetables. Vegetarian versions may substitute soy sauce for the fish sauce and omit the shrimp entirely.

History
Though stir-fried rice noodles were introduced to Thailand from China centuries ago, the dish pad thai was invented in the mid-20th century.

Author Mark Padoongpatt maintains that pad thai is "...not this traditional, authentic, going back hundreds of years dish. It was actually created in the 1930s in Thailand. The dish was created because Thailand was focused on nation-building. So this dish was created using rice noodles and called it pad Thai as a way to galvanize nationalism."

Another explanation of pad thai's provenance holds that, during World War II, Thailand suffered a rice shortage due to the war and floods. To reduce domestic rice consumption, the Thai government under Prime Minister Plaek Phibunsongkhram promoted consumption of noodles instead. His government promoted rice noodles and helped to establish the identity of Thailand. As a result, a new noodle called sen chan (named after Chanthaburi Province) was created. Pad thai has since become one of Thailand's national dishes. Today, some food vendors add pork or chicken (although the original recipe did not contain meat because of the government's perception that pork was a Chinese meat). Some food vendors still use the original recipe.

Thai-American food writer Kasma Loha-unchit disputes the claim of a native Thai origin and suggests that pad thai was actually invented by the Chinese immigrants themselves, because "for a dish to be so named in its own country clearly suggests an origin that isn't Thai". Noodle cookery in most Southeast Asian countries was introduced by the wave of immigrants from southern China settling in the region the past century. Loha-unchit states that the ethnic Chinese of Thailand were aware that "Central Thai people were very fond of the combination of hot, sour, sweet and salty flavors, they added these to their stir-fried noodle dishes and gave it a fusion name, much like Western chefs today are naming their dishes Thai this or Thai that on their East-West menus."

At least as early as 2001, the Thai government used pad thai as a form of "soft power," creating "the Global Thai Restaurant Company, Ltd., in an effort to establish at least 3,000 Thai restaurants worldwide." The plan included numerous government agencies and resulted in nearly tripling the number of Thai restaurants globally in seventeen years. 

Pad thai is listed at number five on a list of "World's 50 most delicious foods" readers' poll compiled by CNN Go in 2011. The word Pad Thai was officially included in Oxford dictionary in March 2023.

See also

 Thai cuisine
 Tourism in Thailand
 List of noodle dishes
 Oyster omelette: a popular counterpart dish in Thailand
 Phat si-io
 Traditional food
 Mie aceh
 Mie goreng
 Char kway teow
 List of Thai dishes

References

External links
 Your Last Meal with Rachel Belle: "Lauren Weedman, Pad Thai" (podcast), KIRO Seattle

Fried noodles
National dishes
Street food
Thai noodle dishes